William Scott Lee (1851–1916) was an American politician who served as the mayor of Denver, Colorado from 1887 to 1889.

References

 

Mayors of Denver
1851 births
1916 deaths
19th-century American politicians